Kopylovo is a rural locality (a village) in Shemogodskoye Rural Settlement, Velikoustyugsky District, Vologda Oblast, Russia. The population was 10 as of 2002.

Geography 
The distance to Veliky Ustyug is 10 km, to Aristovo is 7 km. Rukavishnikovo is the nearest rural locality.

References 

Rural localities in Velikoustyugsky District